Tribe Pictures is a film production company headquartered in Chatham Borough, New Jersey.  They produced A Modern Affair, a 1996 independent feature film, directed by Vern Oakley, CEO of Tribe.

Productions
 A Modern Affair
 Symphony: Stanley Black & Decker 
 Twice As: Actavis
 The Greatness Before Us: Agnes Scott College

References

Film production companies of the United States
Mass media companies established in 1986
Companies based in Morris County, New Jersey